The Mulsanne Straight (Ligne Droite des Hunaudières in French) is the name used in English for a formerly  long straight of the Circuit de la Sarthe around which the 24 Hours of Le Mans auto race takes place. Since 1990, the straight is interrupted by two chicanes, with the last section (that includes a slight right turn known as the "Kink") leading to a sharp corner near the village of Mulsanne.

French name
When races are not taking place, the Mulsanne Straight is part of the national road system of France. It is called the Ligne Droite des Hunaudières, a part of the route départementale RD 338 (formerly Route Nationale RN 138) in the Sarthe department. The Hunaudières leads to the village of Mulsanne, its English namesake (though the French Route de Mulsanne is the name for the road between Mulsanne and Arnage, with the Indianapolis corner in between).

History

During the 1911 Grand Prix season, the Grand Prix de France used an early version of the Circuit de la Sarthe, which was 54 km in length, and used a longer version of the current straight, running from Ave George Durand at Le Tertre Rouge, to Écommoy, before heading towards Saint-Mars-d'Outillé, Les Jouanneries and Parigné-l'Évêque.

The circuit (and straight) were shortened in 1921. After exiting the Tertre Rouge corner, cars would spend almost half of the lap at full throttle, before braking for the right-hand Mulsanne Corner. The Porsche 917 longtail with its 4.9-litre flat-12 engine, used from 1969 to 1971, had reached .

Speeds on the straight by Group C prototypes reached over  during the late 1980s. At the beginning of the 1988 24 Hours of Le Mans race, Paris garage owner Roger Dorchy drove for Welter Racing in a car dubbed the WM P88. The P88 belonged to a program known as "Project 400" and was powered by a 2.8-litre turbocharged Peugeot PRV V6 engine, which sacrificed reliability for power. As a result, the car was out after just 53 laps (or approximately 4 hours) with turbo, cooling and electrical failures.

There were several fatal high-speed accidents on the Mulsanne Straight in the 1980s. Jean-Louis Lafosse was killed in 1981, and Jo Gartner in 1986; in 1984 a French track marshal was killed in an accident at the Kink involving the two Aston Martin Nimrod NRA/C2s of British driver John Sheldon and his American teammate Drake Olson. The wreckage finally came to a halt 600 metres down the road. Although the vehicle was almost obliterated, Percy somehow walked away from the crash with nothing more than a badly battered helmet.

Addition of chicanes 
The 6km (3.7 mi) Mulsanne Straight caused tyre and engine failures, as cars reached over 320km/h (200mph) before braking hard for the sharp right turn at its end. Since their installation, most leading cars have topped out around  during qualifying and  during the race.

The highest speed on the Straight since 1990 was achieved by a Nissan R90CK driven by Mark Blundell, which reached 366 km/h (226.9 mph) during qualifying when the twin-turbo system's wastegate was stuck shut, leading the engine to produce well over its regular output of 800 bhp. The exact power increase remains unknown.

Spectator access
In the past, spectators could obtain magnificent views of cars racing along the straight during the Le Mans, including while dining at various restaurants—such as Restaurant de 24 Heures and Les Virages de L'Arche—located very close to the road. However, in 1990, the viewing experience obtained at both restaurants was diminished with the introduction of the chicanes.

Today, due to safety concerns, spectators are kept well away from the edge of the straight by marshals and police, and while dining guests can still hear the cars pass, their view is obscured by green covers attached to the safety fencing.

Namesake
Three Bentley cars are named after the straight and nearby villages: the Mulsanne,  the Arnage, and the Hunaudières concept car.

GM offered its 1970 Corvette in a color named Mulsanne blue.

References

Bibliography
 
 
 
 
 
 
 

Sports venues in Sarthe
Buildings and structures in Le Mans
Sport in Le Mans
Tourist attractions in Sarthe